The Very Best of Love is a compilation album by American R&B/soul singer Luther Vandross, released in 2002 (see 2002 in music).

Track listing
"Power of Love/Love Power" – 6:41
"Never Too Much" – 3:51
"Stop to Love" – 5:10
"Here and Now" – 5:23
"Endless Love" (with Mariah Carey) – 4:19
"Don't Want to Be a Fool" – 4:35
"Little Miracles (Happen Every Day)" – 4:42
"Any Love" – 5:01
"Heaven Knows" – 4:53
"So Amazing" – 3:39
"How Many Times Can We Say Goodbye" (with Dionne Warwick) – 3:26
"Never Let Me Go" – 4:29

Charts

References

2002 compilation albums
Luther Vandross compilation albums